The St James Workhouse  opened in 1725 on Poland Street in the Soho area of London, England, in what was then the parish of Westminster St James, and continued well into the nineteenth century.

Higginbotham conjectured that the infirmary at St James Workhouse was the one referred to in the American song "St. James Infirmary Blues", on the basis that that song dates from 'at least the early 19th century'.

Inhabitants included the painter Charlotte Mercier, who died there in 1762.

The site of the workhouse is now the Q Park parking garage occupying the space between Poland Street and Marshall Street.

References 

Workhouses in London
1725 establishments in Great Britain
19th-century disestablishments in England
Poor law infirmaries